Austrosticta soror is a species of damselfly in the family Isostictidae,
commonly known as a Kimberley pondsitter. 
It is endemic to the Kimberley region in Western Australia, where it inhabits ponds and streams in gorges.

Austrosticta soror is a dull, dark-coloured, medium-sized damselfly. The female lays her eggs in twigs over water.

Gallery

See also
 List of Odonata species of Australia

References 

Isostictidae
Odonata of Australia
Insects of Australia
Endemic fauna of Australia
Taxa named by Yngve Sjöstedt
Insects described in 1917
Damselflies